Richard David Allan Dodds OBE (born 23 February 1959) is an English former field hockey player. He was captain of the gold medal-winning Great Britain squad in the 1988 Summer Olympics in Seoul. Four years earlier he won Bronze at the 1984 Summer Olympics in Los Angeles. He also captained the England squad who won Silver at the 1986 Hockey World Cup. He was awarded the OBE for services to hockey.

Dodds was born in the English city of York, and was educated at Kingston Grammar School and at St Catharine's College, Cambridge. He currently works as a consultant orthopaedic surgeon at the Royal Berkshire Hospital in Reading, England.

Dodds has played club hockey for Reading and Southgate hockey clubs. He has played veterans hockey with Reading alongside other former Olympians Don Williams, Rob Thompson and John Shaw.

References

External links
 
 

1959 births
Living people
Officers of the Order of the British Empire
Sportspeople from York
English male field hockey players
English Olympic medallists
Olympic field hockey players of Great Britain
British male field hockey players
Field hockey players at the 1984 Summer Olympics
Field hockey players at the 1988 Summer Olympics
Olympic gold medallists for Great Britain
Olympic bronze medallists for Great Britain
People educated at Kingston Grammar School
Alumni of St Catharine's College, Cambridge
Olympic medalists in field hockey
Medalists at the 1988 Summer Olympics
Medalists at the 1984 Summer Olympics
Reading Hockey Club players
Southgate Hockey Club players